Bgheno-Noravank is an 11th-century Armenian monastery in the province of Syunik in Armenia. It now consists of a small church dating to 1062, located on a little wooded promontory, and ornately decorated with borders and biblical reliefs. The ruins of this church were rediscovered in the 1920s by Axel Bakunts, a well-known prose writer, during one of his wanderings as an agronomist.

References

Bibliography

External links 

 Armeniapedia.org: Bgheno-Noravank
 3D model of the Bgheno-Noravank basilica
 About Bgheno-Noravank

Christian monasteries in Armenia
Tourist attractions in Syunik Province
11th-century establishments in Armenia
Christian monasteries established in the 11th century
1062 establishments in Europe
1062 establishments in Asia
Buildings and structures in Syunik Province